The 2016–17 South Dakota State Jackrabbits men's basketball team represented South Dakota State University during the 2016–17 NCAA Division I men's basketball season. The Jackrabbits, led by first-year head coach T. J. Otzelberger, played their home games at Frost Arena in Brookings, South Dakota as members of the Summit League. They finished the season 18–17, 8–8 in Summit League play to finish in a three-way tie for fourth place. As the No. 4 seed in the Summit League tournament, they defeated Denver, South Dakota, and Omaha to win the tournament championship. As a result, they earned the league's automatic bid to the NCAA tournament. As the No. 16 seed in the West region, they lost in the first round to Gonzaga.

Previous season 
The Jackrabbits finished the 2015–16 season 26–8, 12–4 in Summit League play to share the Summit League regular season championship. They defeated Oral Roberts, Denver, and North Dakota State to win the Summit League tournament. As a result, they received the conference's automatic bid to the NCAA tournament. As a No. 12 seed in the South Region, they were eliminated by No. 5-seeded Maryland in the first round.

On April 4, head coach Scott Nagy resigned to become the head coach at Wright State. On April 13, the school hired T. J. Otzelberger as head coach.

Roster

Schedule and results

|-
!colspan=9 style=| Exhibition

|-
!colspan=9 style=| Non-conference regular season 

|-
!colspan=9 style=| Summit League regular season

|-
!colspan=9 style=| Summit League tournament

|-
!colspan=9 style=| NCAA tournament

References

South Dakota State Jackrabbits men's basketball seasons
South Dakota State
South Dakota State
2016 in sports in South Dakota
2017 in sports in South Dakota